Katia Clement-Heydra is a Canadian-born women's ice hockey player, whose final season of professional hockey saw her skate for Modo Hockey in the SDHL. 

Selected by the Canadiennes de Montreal in the second round of the 2015 CWHL Draft, she would score the opening goal in the finals of the 2017 Clarkson Cup.

Playing career

McGill Martlets
In her fourth season with the McGill Martlets women's ice hockey program, she captured the Brodrick Trophy, awarded to the player of the year in Canadian Interuniversity Sport women's ice hockey. 

It marked the third straight season that a member of the Martlets captured the Brodrick Trophy, following Melodie Daoust in 2013, and Ann-Sophie Bettez in 2012. As a side note, Daoust, Bettez and Clement-Heydra would also be teammates at the CWHL level with the Canadiennes de Montreal. 
During the 2013-14 CIS women's ice hockey season, Clement-Heydra led all players in the RSEQ conference with 40 points, while ranking second overall among all competitors in the CIS. Appearing in 20 games, she would record 13 goals, of which four were game-winning goals.

International
In December 2013, Clement-Heydra competed with the Canadian national women's team in women's ice hockey at the 2013 Winter Universiade in Trentino, Italy. Helping Canada capture its third consecutive gold medal, she finished second overall among all competing players with 18 points, on the strength of 13 assists, in seven games played.

Following the shutdown of the CWHL, Clement-Heydra opted to play professionally in Europe, skating with Modo Hockey Dam.

Coaching career
Following a career-ending injury competing professionally in Sweden, Clement-Heydra would transition to coaching. Returning to her home province of Quebec, Clement-Heydra was named one of the recipients of the BFL Female Coach of the Year Award in 2021. Awarded by Hockey Canada, Clement-Heydra was the provincial winner for Quebec in the Community Category. In the High Performance Category, Noemie Tanguay was named as the provincial winner for Quebec.

Awards and honours
2016-17 Clarkson Cup - CWNL Champions
2012-13 Second Team CIS All-Canadian 
2013-14 First Team CIS All-Canadian 
2013-14 RSEQ conference scoring title 
2014 Brodrick Trophy
RSEQ Finalist, 2014 BLG Awards (Female)

Coaching
2021 BFL Female Coach of the Year Award Provincial Winner: Quebec (Community Category)

References

1989 births
Living people
Canadian women's ice hockey forwards
Clarkson Cup champions
Competitors at the 2013 Winter Universiade
Ice hockey people from Quebec
Modo Hockey players
Les Canadiennes de Montreal players
McGill Martlets ice hockey players
People from Saint-Bruno-de-Montarville
Universiade medalists in ice hockey
Universiade gold medalists for Canada